The 75th annual Cannes Film Festival is a film festival that took place from 17 to 28 May 2022. The festival featured a tribute to actor Tom Cruise, whose film Top Gun: Maverick premiered at the festival and where the actor was awarded an Honorary Palme d'Or award on short notice. The official poster for the festival was designed as a homage to The Truman Show (1998).

The festival returned to its full spectator capacity after disruption to the previous two year's editions due to COVID-19 restrictions in France.

Juries
The following juries were named for the festival.

Main competition
 Vincent Lindon,  French actor, Jury President
 Asghar Farhadi, Iranian director, screenwriter and producer
 Rebecca Hall, English actress, producer, director and screenwriter
 Ladj Ly, French director, screenwriter, actor and producer
 Jeff Nichols, American director and screenwriter
 Deepika Padukone, Indian actress
 Noomi Rapace, Swedish actress
 Joachim Trier, Norwegian director and screenwriter
 Jasmine Trinca, Italian actress and director

Un Certain Regard
 Valeria Golino, Italian actress, director and producer, Jury President
 Benjamin Biolay, French singer, songwriter, actor and producer
 Debra Granik, American director
 Joanna Kulig, Polish actress
 Édgar Ramírez, Venezuelan actor and producer

Caméra d'or
 Rossy de Palma, Spanish actress, Jury President
 Natasza Chroscicki, French general director of Arri France
 Lucien Jean-Baptiste, French director, screenwriter and actor
 Jean-Claude Larrieu, French cinematographer
 Samuel Le Bihan, French actor
 Olivier Pelisson, French film critic
 Éléonore Weber, French director and author

Cinéfondation and short films
 Yousry Nasrallah, Egyptian director, Jury President
 Monia Chokri, Canadian actress, director and screenwriter
 Félix Moati, French actor, director and screenwriter
 Laura Wandel, Belgian director and screenwriter
 Jean-Claude Raspiengeas, French journalist and literary critic

Independent juries
International Critics' Week
 Kaouther Ben Hania, Tunisian director and screenwriter, Jury President
 Benoît Debie, Belgian cinematographer
 Benedikt Erlingsson, Icelandic director
 Huh Moon-yung, Korean film critic and director of the Busan International Film Festival
 Ariane Labed, French-Greek actress

Queer Palm
 Catherine Corsini, French director and screenwriter, Jury President
 Djanis Bouzyani, French actor, director and screenwriter
 Marilou Duponchel, French journalist
 Stéphane Riethauser, Swiss director
 Paul Struthers, Australian producer

L'Œil d'or
 Agnieszka Holland, Polish director, Jury President
 Pierre Deladonchamps, French actor
 Hicham Falah, Moroccan general director of the Agadir International Documentary Film Festival
 Iryna Tsilyk, Ukrainian director and writer
 Alex Vicente, Spanish film critic

Official selection

In competition
The following films were selected to compete for the Palme d'Or:

Un Certain Regard
The following films were selected to compete in the Un Certain Regard section:

(CdO) indicates film eligible for the Caméra d'Or as a feature directorial debut.

Out of competition
The following films were selected to be screened out of competition:

Cannes Premiere
The following films were selected to be screened in the Cannes Premiere section:

Special Screenings

(CdO) indicates film eligible for the Caméra d'Or as a feature directorial debut.

Short films
Out of 3,507 entries, the following films were selected to compete for the Short Film Palme d'Or.

Cinéfondation
The Cinéfondation section focuses on films made by students at film schools. The following 16 entries (13 live-action and 3 animated films) were selected out of 1,528 submissions. Four of the films selected represent schools participating in Cinéfondation for the first time.

Cannes Classics
The following films were selected to be screened in Cannes Classics:

Restorations

(CdO) indicates film eligible for the Caméra d'Or as a feature directorial debut.

Documentaries

(CdO) indicates film eligible for the Caméra d'Or as a feature directorial debut.

Cinéma de la plage 
The following films have been selected to be screened out of competition, in the "Cinéma de la plage" section.

Parallel sections

International Critics' Week
The following films were selected to be screened in the International Critics' Week.

In competition 

(CdO) indicates film eligible for the Caméra d'Or as a feature directorial debut.

Special screenings 

(CdO) indicates film eligible for the Caméra d'Or as a feature directorial debut.

Directors' Fortnight
The following films were selected to be screened in the Directors' Fortnight section:

Features 

(CdO) indicates film eligible for the Caméra d'Or as a feature directorial debut.

Special screenings

Awards

In Competition 
The following awards were presented for films shown In Competition:
 Palme d'Or: Triangle of Sadness by Ruben Östlund
 Grand Prix: 
 Close by Lukas Dhont
 Stars at Noon by Claire Denis
 Best Director: Park Chan-wook for Decision to Leave
 Best Actress: Zar Amir Ebrahimi for Holy Spider
 Best Actor: Song Kang-ho for Broker
 Best Screenplay: Tarik Saleh for Boy from Heaven
 Jury Prize: 
 EO by Jerzy Skolimowski
 The Eight Mountains by Felix van Groeningen and Charlotte Vandermeersch
 75th Anniversary Prize: Tori and Lokita by Jean-Pierre and Luc Dardenne

Un Certain Regard 
 Un Certain Regard Award: The Worst Ones by Lise Akoka & Romane Gueret
 Un Certain Regard Jury Prize: Joyland by Saim Sadiq
 Un Certain Regard Best Director: Alexandru Belc for Metronom Un Certain Regard Best Performance Prize (jointly awarded): 
 Vicky Krieps in Corsage 
 Adam Bessa in Harka Un Certain Regard Best Screenplay Prize: Mediterranean Fever by Maha Haj
 Un Certain Regard « Coup de cœur » Prize: Rodeo by Lola Quivoron

 Cinéfondation 
 First Prize: A Conspiracy Man by Valerio Ferrara
 Second Prize: Somewhere by Li Jiahe
 Third Prize (jointly awarded): 
 Glorious Revolution by Masha Novikova
 Humans Are Dumber When Crammed up Together by Laurène Fernandez

 Honorary Palme d'Or 
 Honorary Palme d'Or: 
 Forest Whitaker
 Tom Cruise

 Golden Camera 
 Caméra d'Or: War Pony by Riley Keough and Gina Gammell

Independent awards
FIPRESCI Prizes
 In Competition: Leila's Brothers by Saeed Roustaee
 Un Certain Regard: The Blue Caftan by Maryam Touzani 
 Parallel section (first features): Love According to Dalva by Emmanuelle Nicot (International Critics' Week)

Ecumenical Prize
 Prize of the Ecumenical Jury: Broker by Hirokazu Kore-eda

International Critics' Week
 Grand Prize: La Jauria by Andrés Ramírez Pulido
 French Touch Prize of the Jury: Aftersun by Charlotte Wells
 Louis Roederer Foundation Rising Star Award: Zelda Samson for Love According To Dalva Leitz Cine Discovery Prize for Short Film: Ice Merchants by João Gonzalez
 Gan Foundation Award for Distribution: The Woodcutter Story by Mikko Myllylahti
 SACD Prize: Andrés Ramírez Pulido for La Jauria Canal+ Award for Short Film: On Xerxes’ Throne by Evi Kalogiropoulou

Directors' Fortnight
 Europa Cinemas Label Award for Best European Film: One Fine Morning by Mia Hansen-Løve
 SACD Award for Best French-language Film: The Mountain by Thomas Salvador
 Carrosse d'Or: Kelly Reichardt

L'Œil d'or
 L'Œil d'or: All That Breathes by Shaunak Sen
 Jury's Special Award: Mariupolis 2 by Mantas Kvedaravicius

Queer Palm
 Queer Palm Award: Joyland by Saim Sadiq
 Short Film Queer Palm: Will You Look At Me by Shuli Huang

Prix François Chalais
 François Chalais Prize: Boy from Heaven by Tarik Saleh

Prix de la Citoyenneté
  Citizenship Prize: Leila's Brothers by Saeed Roustaee

Cannes Soundtrack Award
 Cannes Soundtrack Award: Paweł Mykietyn for EOPrix des Cinémas Art et Essai
  AFCAE Art House Cinema Award: Triangle of Sadness by Ruben Östlund
  Special Mention: EO by Jerzy Skolimowski

Palm Dog
 Palm Dog Award: Brit in War Pony Grand Jury Prize: 
  Marcel in Marcel!  Canine cast in Godland Palm DogManitarian Award: Patron (Ukrainian Jack Russell terrier mine sniffer)
 Palm Hound Dog: Titane

Trophée Chopard
 Chopard Trophy: Sheila Atim and Jack Lowden

TikTok Short Film Competition
The 2022 Cannes Film Festival also saw the first edition of the TikTok Short Film Competition. It was organized in partnership with social media giant TikTok, and was part of a desire to diversify the audience of the festival. The jury consisted of Oscar-nominated director Rithy Panh, world-famous TikTok creator Khaby Lame, director Camille Ducellier, director-stylist Basma Khalifa and writer-director Angele Diabang. The first Grand Prix Award for Best Film was given to Matej Rimanić, for his film Love In Plane Sight, the second Grand Prix Award was given to Mabuta Motoki, for his film Is it Okay to Chop Down Trees?. The jury also awarded Tim Hamilton with his film Zero Gravity for Best Edit, and Claudia Cochet with her film Modern Princess'' for Best Script.

References

External links
 

2022 film festivals
2022 in French cinema
2022